Ettadhamen-Mnihla is a former municipality of the governorate of Ariana attached to the agglomeration of Tunis before being divided in 2016 into two distinct municipalities: Ettadhamen and Mnihla.

See also
List of cities in Tunisia

References

Populated places in Ariana Governorate
Communes of Tunisia
Tunisia geography articles needing translation from French Wikipedia